Jermaine Dave McGlashan (born 14 April 1988) is an English former professional footballer who played as a midfielder and can play on either wing or behind the striker in an attacking midfield role. He also played up front on numerous occasions. He is currently manager of Fleet Town

Playing career
Born in Croydon, London, McGlashan started out in the youth team at Tooting & Mitcham United before moving to Staines Town's youth team.

In October 2006, McGlashan signed for the Staines Town first team, before being loaned out to Bracknell Town on dual registration terms. In the summer of 2008, he joined Kingstonian before being loaned out to Raynes Park Vale for the 2008–09 season. In July 2009, McGlashan moved on to Merstham before moving on again, this time joining Ashford Town (Middlesex) in December 2009.

In the summer of 2010, McGlashan had trials for Bristol Rovers, Hayes & Yeading United and Southampton before signing for Aldershot Town on a one-year deal. On 10 August, he made his professional debut, when he came on as a second half substitute against Watford in the League Cup.

On 20 January 2012, Cheltenham Town signed Jermaine McGlashan on a -year contract, fighting off competition from League Two rivals Gillingham, for a reported £50–60,000. He was the first Cheltenham player to be signed in a January transfer window requiring a fee. On 25 February 2012, McGlashan got his first Cheltenham Town goal in a 2–0 win over Burton Albion at home. McGlashan also won the club's Man of the Match award that day. McGlashan left the club at the end of the 2013–14 season after rejecting a new contract with the "Robins" and considered offers from numerous League One, Two and Scottish League sides. He then joined League One side Gillingham on a two-year contract. After his two-year spell at the club, he was released.

On 23 June 2016 McGlashan signed for League One side Southend United on a two-year contract, with the option of a third year. At the end of the 2017–18 season he was released by the club, following which he joined Swindon Town.

On 7 March 2019, McGlashan signed for Wrexham on loan from Swindon until the end of the 2018–19 season after manager Richie Wellens revealed he had no plans to include McGlashan in his squad for the following season and he was sent out on loan again to National League side Chesterfield until January 2020. McGlashan was released by Swindon in January 2020.

Following his release from Swindon, McGlashan joined Ebbsfleet United until the end of the 2019–20 season.

In September 2020, McGlashan announced that he had joined Cypriot Second Division side Akritas Chlorakas.

Coaching career
McGlashan was appointed joint manager of the under-18 team at Ashford Town (Middlesex) in June 2021. In the summer of 2021, he signed for National League South side Maidstone United following his return from Cyprus. Having been restricted to appearances mainly from the bench, he left for Isthmian League Premier Division side Leatherhead as player/assistant manager on 8 January 2022. In November 2022 he was appointed manager of Fleet Town.

Career statistics

Personal life
McGlashan was born in England and is of Grenadian descent.

References

External links

1988 births
Living people
Footballers from Croydon
English footballers
English sportspeople of Grenadian descent
Association football midfielders
Staines Town F.C. players
Bracknell Town F.C. players
Kingstonian F.C. players
Raynes Park Vale F.C. players
Merstham F.C. players
Ashford Town (Middlesex) F.C. players
Aldershot Town F.C. players
Cheltenham Town F.C. players
Gillingham F.C. players
Southend United F.C. players
Swindon Town F.C. players
Wrexham A.F.C. players
Chesterfield F.C. players
Ebbsfleet United F.C. players
Akritas Chlorakas players
Maidstone United F.C. players
Leatherhead F.C. players
Isthmian League players
Southern Football League players
English Football League players
National League (English football) players
Cypriot Second Division players
Black British sportspeople
English expatriate footballers
English expatriate sportspeople in Cyprus
Expatriate footballers in Cyprus
Fleet Town F.C. managers